Juan Carlos Campuzano (born July 25, 1949) is a Paraguayan American physicist. He is a Distinguished Professor of Physics at the University of Illinois at Chicago. He was a Distinguished Fellow at Argonne National Laboratory (the equivalent of an endowed chair), and a he is also a 2001 American Physical Society Fellow and a recipient of the 2011 Oliver Buckley Prize in Condensed Matter Physics.
He is an expert in high-temperature superconductivity.

Campuzano obtained his B.S. and Ph.D. in physics from University of Wisconsin–Milwaukee in 1972 and 1978, respectively. He has also worked as a Post-Doctoral Fellow and Research Associate at the University of Liverpool and the University of Cambridge. His research interests include infrared spectroscopy on metal surfaces, electronic excitations in high temperature superconductors and other materials, etc.

Education
Ph.D., Physics, University of Wisconsin–Milwaukee, 1978.
B.S., Applied Mathematics and Physics, University of Wisconsin–Milwaukee, 1972.

Awards
Buckley Prize, 2011
Outstanding Alumnus Award, University of Wisconsin-Milwaukee 2008
HENAAC Outstanding Technical Achievement Award, 2007
Fellow, American Physical Society, 2001.
The University of Chicago Medal for Distinguished Performance at Argonne National Laboratory, 1999.
Fellow, Cambridge Philosophical Society, 1985
The American Vacuum Society Scholar, 1975.
Research Fellowship, International Centre for Theoretical Physics, Trieste, Italy, 1974.

Selected publications

References

External links
homepage at UIC
homepage at Argonne National Laboratory

1949 births
Living people
21st-century American physicists
University of Illinois Chicago faculty
University of Wisconsin–Milwaukee alumni
Fellows of the American Physical Society
American people of Paraguayan descent
Oliver E. Buckley Condensed Matter Prize winners